UPF0172 protein FAM158A, also known as c14orf122 or CGI112, is a protein that in humans is encoded by the FAM158A gene located on chromosome 14q11.2.

Human FAM158A and its paralogs in other species are part of the uncharacterized protein family UPF0172 family, which is a subset of the JAB1/Mov34/MPN/PAD-1 ubiquitin protease protein family.  The MPN superfamily contributes to ubiquitination and de-ubiquitination activity within the cell.  The UPF0172 subset no longer has a functional ubiquitination domain and the function is uncharacterized.

Gene 

Fam158a is positioned between PSME1 (antisense) and PSME2 (sense).  RNF31 is upstream and antisense to Fam158a. DCAF11 and FITM1 are both upstream of PSME1 antisense to Fam158a.  PSME1 is a subunit of the 11S regulator which is a part of the immunoproteasome responsible for cleaving MHC class I peptides.  PSME2 is another subunit of the 11S regulator  RNF31 encodes a protein which contains a ring finger motif found in several proteins which mediate protein-DNA and protein-protein interactions.  FITM1 is a protein involved in fat storage.  DCAF11 is a protein that is known to interact with COP9 and has several alternative transcripts.

Promoter

The promoter is conserved as far back as Danio rerio. Softberry's FGenesH predicts two upstream promoters, a TATA Box 461bp upstream of the start site and another uncharacterized promoter 83bp upstream.  Genomatix ElDorado predicts several transcription factor binding sites in the promoter region. found that Fam158a expression increases in GATA3 mutants, and as seen in the table, the Fam158a promoter region contains a Gata binding site. Another study shows FAM158A responds to Beta-catenin depletion. Although there are no known beta-catenin binding sites in the promoter, there is a NeuroD site and NeuroD responds to beta-catenin.

Homology

Paralogs 

The paralog to FAM158A is commonly known as Cox4NB and is located at 16q24.  It is also referred to as Cox4AL, Noc4, and Fam158b.  The paralog partially overlaps COX4I1 and has two isoforms. Isoform 1 is the complete isoform at 210 amino acids while isoform 2 is 126 amino acids. Like Fam158a, Cox4NB is highly conserved in Eukaryotes from mammals to as far back as fish. Currently there is no known function of Cox4NB.  In most fish and further back there is a single homolog, the predecessor to Cox4NB and Fam158a.

Homologs 

As shown in the alignment, the protein is highly conserved chemically, although the exact sequence varies.  There are also several regions of high conservation (highlighted by the red boxes).  The degree of conservation follows the expected evolutionary pattern. The graph demonstrates this by plotting each species protein similarity to the human protein vs. the time since the species shared a common ancestor.  The unrooted phylogenetic tree also demonstrates this relationship.

Protein 

Fam158a has an isoelectric point of 5.5 and a molecular weight of 23 kiloDaltons. Fam158a does not have any predicted signal peptides or transmembrane regions.  There are several predicted phosphorylation sites. marked in the conceptual translation as well as the predicted secondary structure. There are no regions significantly different from other human proteins with regard to composition, regions of polarity, or regions of hydrophobicity.  iPsortII predicts no signal peptides and localizes Fam158a to the cytoplasm- I-Tasser predicts several structures for Fam158a and the best prediction is shown.   Swiss Model predicts two potential protein structures, as seen in the images. The first structure predicts the protein forms a protein dimer, the second as a monomer.  Rual et al. found that Fam158a interacts with a protein called TTC35.  The function of TTC35 is unknown but it is also known to interact with Cox4NB and Ubiquitin C.

Function 

Fam158a is nearly ubiquitously expressed throughout the human body. The homolog in mice also shows expression throughout the entire body. Several micro-arrays demonstrate the variable expression of Fam158a in response to other factors and in various cancer types. None of this information gives any indication of a specific function but the wide expression of the gene and its high conservation indicate that Fam158a plays an important role in cellular function.

Clinical significance 

There are several diseases associated with deletions of 14q11.2, but none have been linked specifically to Fam158a. T-Lymphocytic Leukemia with or without ataxia telangiectasia has been associated with inversions and tandem translocations of 14q11 and 14q32 and other chromosomes. Also, syndactyly type 2 has been isolated to 14q11.2-12. This form of syndactyly is characterized by fusion of the third and fourth digits of the hand and the fourth and fifth digits of the foot in addition to other fusions and malformations.

References